Mohammad Barghouti  (محمد برغوثي) was the Minister of Local Government in the Palestinian Authority coalition cabinet.  He held the post of Labor Minister in the previous cabinet.  Mohammad Barghouti was arrested by Israel on 29 June 2006 as part of Israel's Operation Summer Rains.  Mohammad Bargouti was on his way to a village north of Ramallah when his car was stopped by jeeps and placed under arrest.  He was released on 14 August 2006.

References

Hamas members
Living people
Government ministers of the Palestinian National Authority
Year of birth missing (living people)
Al-Quds University alumni
Palestinian politicians
An-Najah National University alumni